Sarimi is the fourth most popular instant noodle brand in Indonesia, and is produced by PT Indofood CBP Sukses Makmur Tbk, launched in 1982, fourteen years after Supermi and ten years after Indomie. In Indonesia, the term "Sarimi" is also commonly used as a generic term that refers to instant noodles.

Sarimi standard flavors:
 Sarimi Rasa Soto (Sarimi Soto Flavored)
 Sarimi Rasa Ayam Bawang (Sarimi Onion Chicken Flavor)
 Sarimi Rasa Baso Sapi (Sarimi Beef Meatball Flavor)
 Sarimi Rasa Sate (Sarimi Satay Flavor)
 Sarimi Mi Goreng (Sarimi Fried Noodles)
 Sarimi Rasa Ayam (Sarimi Chicken Flavor)

References

Indonesian brands
Indonesian noodles
Instant noodle brands